Ang sa Iyo ay Akin (International title: The Law of Revenge / ) is a Philippine television drama revenge series broadcast by Kapamilya Channel. The series premiered on the network's Primetime Bida evening block and worldwide via The Filipino Channel from August 17, 2020 to March 19, 2021, replacing Make It with You on its previous timeslot and The World of a Married Couple.

Series overview

 iWantTFC shows two episodes first in advance before it broadcasts on TV.

Episodes

Season 1

Season 2

References

Lists of Philippine drama television series episodes